The Band and I is an album by vocalist Irene Kral performing with Herb Pomeroy's Orchestra which was recorded in 1958 and originally released on the United Artists label.

Reception

The Allmusic review by Jason Ankeney stated "The Band and I pairs Irene Kral with Ernie Wilkins and Al Cohn, whose energetic, robust arrangements capture a dimension of the singer rarely glimpsed on record – upbeat and persuasive, with little of the spectral melancholy that hangs over her later, more familiar sessions. The titular backing unit in question, led by trumpeter Herb Pomeroy, expertly bridges the gap between traditional big band and modern-era jazz, creating a soulful, lightly swinging showcase that inspires Kral to deliver some of her most appealing performances".

Track listing
 "I'd Know You Anywhere" (Jimmy McHugh, Johnny Mercer) – 2:14
 "Detour Ahead" (Herb Ellis, Johnny Frigo, Lou Carter) – 3:43
 "Comes Love" (Sam H. Stept, Lew Brown, Charles Tobias) – 2:36
 "Everybody Knew But Me" (Irving Berlin) – 2:01
 "Lazy Afternoon" (Jerome Moross, John La Touche) – 2:56
 "What's Right for You" (Bernle Gluckman, Thomas A. Goodman, Hubert Doris) – 3:01
 "I Let a Song Go Out of My Heart" (Duke Ellington, Irving Mills, Henry Nemo, John Redmond) – 2:46
 "Memphis in June" (Hoagy Carmichael, Paul Francis Webster) – 2:58
 "This Little Love" (Tommy Wolf, Fran Landesman) – 2:07
 "The Night We Called It a Day" (Matt Dennis, Tom Adair) – 2:32
 "It Isn't So Good" (Wolf, Landesman) – 2:32
 "Something to Remember You By" (Howard Dietz, Arthur Schwartz) – 2:12

Personnel 
Irene Kral – vocals
Herb Pomeroy – bandleader, trumpet
Lenny Johnson, Augie Ferretti, Nick Capezuto, Bill Berry – trumpet
Gene DiStasio, Bill Legan, Joe Ciavardone – trombone
Dave Chapman, Charlie Mariano – alto saxophone
Varty Haroutunian, Joe Carusso – tenor saxophone
Jimmy Mosher – baritone saxophone
Ray Santisi – piano
John Neves – bass
Jimmy Zitano – drums
Al Cohn (tracks 2–5, 8 & 12), Ernie Wilkins (tracks 1, 6, 7 & 9–11) – arranger

References 

1959 albums
Irene Kral albums
Herb Pomeroy albums
United Artists Records albums
Albums arranged by Al Cohn
Albums arranged by Ernie Wilkins